Andrew Lysander Stone (July 16, 1902 – June 9, 1999) was an American screenwriter, film director and producer. He was nominated for an Academy Award for Best Original Screenplay for the film Julie in 1957 and received a star on the Hollywood Walk of Fame in 1960.

Known for his hard-hitting, realistic films, Stone frequently collaborated with his first wife, editor and producer Virginia Lively Stone (m 1946). Though few of his films achieved mainstream success, Stone was nominated for an Academy Award for Best Original Screenplay for his 1956 thriller Julie.

Stone's stories frequently featured characters called Cole, Pringle and Pope, usually in law enforcement and interchangeably played by the same actors—Jack Kruschen, Barney Phillips and John Gallaudet. Roles with those names were included in A Blueprint for Murder, The Night Holds Terror, Julie, Cry Terror! and The Decks Ran Red.

Career
Born in Oakland, California, Andrew L. Stone attended the University of California. He built a movie theater in his back yard, with two projectors and seats for 50 kids. Films were bought at a dollar a reel.

Stone worked for a film exchange for Universal after school and on Sundays. "I wanted anything I could get to do with films - rewinding, splicing, projecting," he once said.

In the mid-'20s, he moved to Hollywood and worked in a laboratory. He also worked in Universal's prop department.

Early movies
In 1926, Stone financed his first directorial effort The Elegy (1926), a two-reel movie. It cost $3,200, which he had raised himself and was made on sets left over from Scaramouche.

His first full-length feature was Dreary House (1928). He worked as director on Shadows of Glory (1930), Hell's Headquarters (1932) and The Girl Said No (1937).

Paramount
Stone says that MGM offered him a contract in the mid 1930s but he was reluctant to take it. He later said, “I’d have had to pacify the stars and keep them happy – like a priest who doesn’t believe a word of what he says. Then there was a Paramount contract — no big stars, but freedom. That’s the one I went for. It didn’t take me long to see I’d never make a nickel, but I didn’t give a damn.”

Stone signed a contract at Paramount for whom he made Stolen Heaven (1938), Say It in French (1938) with Ray Milland, The Great Victor Herbert (1939), and The Hard-Boiled Canary (1941). He was meant to make Manhattan Rhapsody for the studio.
 
At 20th Century Fox he earned acclaim for directing the 1943 film Stormy Weather, starring Lena Horne.

United Artists
Stone formed his own production company, Andrew L Stone Productions, with his then-wife Virginia. They signed a deal with United Artists to make two films: Hi Diddle Diddle (1943) and Sensations of 1945 (1944). United Artists were pleased enough to offer him a deal to make four more films over eighteen months: Bedside Manner (1945), The Bachelor's Daughters (1946), and Fun on a Weekend (1947). They left United Artists in 1947.

He did some uncredited directing on The Countess of Monte Cristo (1948).

Thrillers
Stone went to Warner Bros for Highway 301 (1950).Highway 301 was a crime film and ushered in a series of movies from Stone in that genre.

"I had to talk Bernie Foy at Warners into letting me do a melodrama," Stone said later. "I made it practically for nothing to establish myself in that field."

It would be Stone's last film shot in a studio. He did Confidence Girl (1952), and two with Joseph Cotten, The Steel Trap (1952) and A Blueprint for Murder (1953).  He did The Night Holds Terror (1955) at Columbia.

MGM
Stone signed a two-picture deal at MGM for whom he made Julie (1956), a thriller with Doris Day and Louis Jourdan, and Cry Terror! (1958), with Rod Steiger. (He had intended to follow Julie with a film about smoking, The Last Puff, but it was not made.)

Julie was a hit so MGM signed them to make four more movies: The Decks Ran Red (1959), The Last Voyage (1960), Ring of Fire (1961), and The Password Is Courage (1962) with Dirk Bogarde.

He did Never Put It in Writing (1964) with Pat Boone for Allied Artists, filmed in England and Ireland. He signed a new two-picture deal with MGM. The first was The Secret of My Success (1965). The second was meant to be a history of aviation written by Ernest Gann, The Winning of the Sky, but it was never made.

Later movies
Stone made a musical for ABC Pictures titled Song of Norway (1970), a $3.5 million musical biopic of Edvard Grieg. The film performed reasonably well, but his next film The Great Waltz (1972) was a big flop.

In 1977, he did some work for Universal on the action and disaster sequences for Rollercoaster.

Selected filmography 
The Elegy (1927) (short) - writer, director
Fantasy (1927) (short) - director
Adoration (1927) (short) - writer, director
Liebensraum  (1928) -director
 Dreary House (1928) - writer, director
 Shadows of Glory aka Sombras de gloria (1930) - director
Hell's Headquarters (1932) - director
The Girl Said No (1937) - director, writer, producer
 With Words and Music (1937) director
 Stolen Heaven (1938) - director, writer
 Say It in French (1938) - director, producer
 The Great Victor Herbert (1939) - director, writer, producer
 The Hard-Boiled Canary (1941) - director, producer, writer
 Stormy Weather (1943) - director
 Hi Diddle Diddle (1943) - director, producer, original story
 Sensations of 1945 (1944) - director, writer, producer
 Bedside Manner (1945) - director, producer
 The Bachelor's Daughters (1946) - director, writer, producer
 Fun on a Weekend (1947) - director, writer, producer
 The Countess of Monte Cristo (1948) - director, uncredited
 Highway 301 (1950) - director, writer
 Confidence Girl (1952) - director, writer, producer
 The Steel Trap (1952) - director, writer
 A Blueprint for Murder (1953) - director, writer
 The Night Holds Terror (1955) - director, writer, producer
Screen Directors Playhouse episode "The Final Tribute" (1955) - writer, director
 Julie (1956) - director, writer
 Cry Terror! (1958) - director, writer, producer
 The Decks Ran Red (1958) - director, writer, producer
 The Last Voyage (1960) - director, writer, producer
 Ring of Fire (1961) - director, writer, producer
 The Password Is Courage (1962) - director, writer, producer
 Never Put It in Writing (1964) - director, writer, producer
 The Secret of My Success (1965) - director, producer
 Song of Norway (1970) - director, writer, producer
 The Great Waltz (1972) - director, writer, producer

References

External links 

Andrew L Stone papers at Academy of Motion Picture Arts and Sciences
Andrew L Stone at Letterbox DVD
Andrew L Stone at BFI
Article on Andrew and Virginia Stone at Bright Lights Film Journal

1902 births
1999 deaths
American male screenwriters
Film producers from California
People from Oakland, California
20th-century American businesspeople
Film directors from California
Screenwriters from California
20th-century American male writers
20th-century American screenwriters